Panaqolus albomaculatus is a species of catfish in the family Loricariidae. It is native to South America, where it occurs in the headwaters of the Napo River, the Marañón River, and the Ucayali River. The species reaches 12.4 cm (4.9 inches) SL. It is sometimes seen in the aquarium trade, where it is typically referred to either as the mustard-spot pleco, the orange-spot pleco, or by its L-number, which is LDA-031 (not to be confused with L-031, which refers to the species Parancistrus nudiventris).

References 

Ancistrini
Fish described in 1958